Anna Dodge (October 18, 1867 – May 4, 1945) was an American silent film actress.

Anna Dodge married fellow actor George Hernandez and was frequently credited as Anna Hernandez.

Filmography

1910s

 Making a Man of Him (1911)
 Out-Generaled (1911)
 Shipwrecked (1911)
 A Cup of Cold Water (1911)
 How Algy Captured a Wild Man (1911)
 The Blacksmith's Love (1911)
 The Regeneration of Apache Kid (1911)
 Their Only Son (1911)
 Slick's Romance (1911)
 The Old Captain (1911)
 It Happened in the West (1911)
 The Craven Heart (1911)
 The White Medicine Man (1911) .... Sitting Horse's Squaw
 A Sacrifice to Civilization (1911)
 Told in the Sierras (1911)
 Range Pals (1911) .... Mrs. Murdock, Steve's Mother
 Where There's a Will, There's a Way (1911)
 Stability vs. Nobility (1911)
 The Herders (1911) (as Mrs. Hernandez)
 The Still Alarm (1911)
 The Little Widow (1911)
 A Frontier Girl's Courage (1911)
 A Diamond in the Rough (1911)
 The Right Name, But the Wrong Man (1911)
 In the Days of Gold (1911) .... Mother Lopez
 Lieutenant Grey of the Confederacy (1911)
 Old Billy (1911)
 The Coquette (1911)
 Little Injin (1911)
 On Separate Paths (1911)
 The Girl and the Cowboy (1912)
 In Exile (1912)
 The Love of an Island Maid (1912)
 The New Woman and the Lion (1912)
 The End of the Romance (1912)
 Tenderfoot Bob's Regeneration (1912)
 The Junior Officer (1912)
 The 'Epidemic' in Paradise Gulch (1912)
 Bounder (1912)
 A Crucial Test (1912)
 The Shrinking Rawhide (1912)
 The Danites (1912)
 Disillusioned (1912) (as Anna Hernandez)
 A Mysterious Gallant (1912)
 Merely a Millionaire (1912)
 The Secret Wedding (1912)
 A Night Out (1912)
 Harbor Island (1912) .... Concha. Isabel's Duenna
 The Girl of the Mountains (1912) (as Anna Hernandez)
 The Vintage of Fate (1912)
 Shanghaied (1912)
 Kings of the Forest (1912)
 Saved by Fire (1912)
 The Fisherboy's Faith (1912)
 The Shuttle of Fate (1912)
 Euchred (1912)
 The Great Drought (1912)
 The Substitute Model (1912)
 The Indelible Stain (1912)
 Land Sharks vs. Sea Dogs (1912)
 A Messenger to Kearney (1912) .... Mother
 The Redemption of Railroad Jack (1913)
 The Old Clerk (1913)
 The Story of Lavinia (1913)
 The Tide of Destiny (1913)
 Unto the Third and Fourth Generation (1914)
 The Run on Percy (1915)
 The Circular Staircase (1915) .... Liddy
 The Rosary (1915) .... Bridget
 Mrs. Murphy's Cooks (1915) .... Mrs. Murphy
 The Timber Wolf (1916)
 Corporal Billy's Comeback (1916) (as Anna Hernandez)
 Hoodoo Ann (1916) (as Anna Hernandez) .... Sarah Higgins
 Framing Framers (1917) .... Mrs. O'Mears
 Until They Get Me (1917) .... Mrs. Draper
 Indiscreet Corinne (1917) .... Mrs. Cotter Brown
 When Liz Lets Loose (1917) (as Anna Hernandez)
 The Devil Dodger (1917) .... Mrs. Ricketts
 Money and Mystery (1917) (as Mrs. G. Hernandez)
 The Girl in the Garret (1917)
 A Midnight Mystery (1917) (as Anna Hernandez)
 The Smoldering Spark (1917)
 Never Too Old to Woo (1917)
 Polly Put the Kettle On (1917)
 Oh! Man! (1918) (as Anna Hernandez)
 The Last Rebel (1918) .... Landlady
 The Lonely Woman (1918) .... Mrs. Peevy
 Mr. Briggs Closes the House (1918)
 Nancy Comes Home (1918) .... Mrs. Jerry Ballou
 Heiress for a Day (1918) .... Mrs. Rockland
 The Shoes That Danced (1918) .... Mrs. Regan
 The Flames of Chance (1918) .... Mrs. Ribbits
 Betty Takes a Hand (1918) .... Gardner's Wife
 Without Honor (1918) .... Mrs. Dawson
 Leave It to Susan (1919) (as Anna Hernandez) .... Ma Burbridge
 Hearts Asleep (1919) .... Mother Hawkins
 Home Run Bill (1919) (as Anna Hernandez)

1920s

 An Amateur Devil (1920) (as Anna Hernandez) .... Mrs. Brown
 Darling Mine (1920) (as Mrs. George Hernandez)
 The Jack-Knife Man (1920) (as Mrs. George Hernandez)
 The Gift Supreme (1920) .... Mrs. Wesson
 Seeing It Through (1920) (as Anna Hernandez) .... Mrs. Tweeney
 The Room of Death (1921) (as Anna Hernandez)
 Molly O' (1921) (as Anna Hernandez) .... Mrs. Tim O'Dair
 The Rowdy (1921) (as Anna Hernandez) .... Mrs. Purcell
 The Servant in the House (1921) (as Mrs. George Hernandez) .... Janitress
 The Pride of Palomar (1922) (as Mrs. George Hernandez) .... Caroline
 The Kentucky Derby (1922) (as Anna Hernandez) .... Mrs. Clancy
 The Extra Girl (1923) (as Anna Hernandez) .... Ma Graham
 The Town Scandal (1923) (as Anna Hernandez) .... Mrs. Crawford
 Black Oxfords (1924) (as Anna Hernandez)
 The Law Forbids (1924) (as Anna Hernandez) .... Martha Martin
 Ride for Your Life (1924) (as Mrs. George Hernandez) .... Mrs. Donnegan
 Name the Man (1924) (as Anna Hernandez) .... Mrs. Quayle
 The Big Palooka (1929) (as Anna Hernandez)

1930s

 Fat Wives for Thin (1930) (as Anna Hernandez)
 Radio Kisses (1930) (as Anna Hernandez)
 He Trumped Her Ace (1930) (uncredited)
 Half Holiday (1931) (as Anna Hernandez)
 Speed (1931) (uncredited) (as Anna Hernandez)
 The Cannonball (1931) (as Anna Hernandez)
 Fainting Lover (1931) (as Anna Hernandez) .... Helen Roberts
 The Albany Branch (1931) (as Anna Hernandez)
 Ex-Sweeties (1931) (as Anna Hernandez)
 The Bride's Mistake (1931) (as Anna Hernandez)
 The Singing Plumber (1932) (as Anna Hernandez)
 Jimmy's New Yacht (1932) (as Anna Hernandez)
 Speed in the Gay Nineties (1932) (as Anna Hernandez)
 Lady! Please! (1932) (as Anna Hernandez)

External links

 

American film actresses
People from River Falls, Wisconsin
American silent film actresses
1867 births
1945 deaths
20th-century American actresses
Actresses from Wisconsin